
Gmina Lisków is a rural gmina (administrative district) in Kalisz County, Greater Poland Voivodeship, in west-central Poland.

Villages
Gmina Lisków contains the villages and settlements of Annopol, Budy Liskowskie, Chrusty, Ciepielew, Józefów, Koźlątków, Lisków, Lisków-Rzgów, Madalin, Małgów, Nadzież, Pyczek, Strzałków, Swoboda, Trzebienie, Wygoda, Zakrzyn, Zakrzyn-Kolonia and Żychów.

Neighbouring gminas
Gmina Lisków is bordered by the gminas of Ceków-Kolonia, Goszczanów, Kawęczyn and Koźminek.

References
Polish official population figures 2006

Liskow
Kalisz County